Seth Conner (born January 29, 1992) is an American professional baseball coach. He is the assistant hitting coach for the Texas Rangers of Major League Baseball (MLB).

Playing career
Conner attended Logan-Rogersville High School in Rogersville, Missouri. He was drafted by the Toronto Blue Jays in the 41st round of the 2010 MLB draft and signed with them. Conner spent the 2010 through 2016 season in the Toronto system, playing for the GCL Blue Jays, Bluefield Blue Jays, Vancouver Canadians, Lansing Lugnuts, and the New Hampshire Fisher Cats.

Coaching career
Conner began his coaching career in the Los Angeles Dodgers organization in 2017. He was an assistant coach for the Great Lakes Loons in 2018. He served as the hitting coach for the Ogden Raptors in 2019. He was set to be the hitting coach for Great Lakes in 2020 before the cancellation of the Minor League Baseball season due to the COVID-19 pandemic. He joined the Minnesota Twins organization and served as the hitting coach for the Florida Complex League Twins in 2021.

On January 6, 2022, Conner was named the assistant hitting coach of the Texas Rangers.

References

External links

1992 births
Living people
People from Rogersville, Missouri
Baseball players from Missouri
Baseball coaches from Missouri
Baseball catchers
Baseball first basemen
Gulf Coast Blue Jays players
Bluefield Blue Jays players
Vancouver Canadians players
Lansing Lugnuts players
New Hampshire Fisher Cats players
Minor league baseball coaches
Major League Baseball hitting coaches
Texas Rangers coaches
American expatriate baseball players in Canada